Spiro is a surname with a variety of origins, as well as a given name among Greek-speaking populations, Albanians,  and the Christians of Lebanon.

Origins
As a Greek name, Spiro may also be spelled Spyro. It comes from the Greek Spiros/Spyros/Speros, with a nominative final "s" that is usually dropped when Anglicised. It is a male given name fairly common in Greek-speaking population (Greece especially in Corfu whose patron saint is Saint Spyridon, in Cyprus, Greek diaspora) as well as among the Christians of Lebanon where it is a common first and last name. It is a shortened form of the archaic-sounding Spyridon (Σπυρίδων), which means in ancient Greek "basket used to carry seeds" (Σπυρί, grain, seed). The Greek diminutives for Spirydon are Pipis (Πίπης ) and Pipeto (Πιπέτο).

Špiro is also a masculine given name in Croatia and Montenegro.

In Germany, the surname Spiro originated as a corruption of Speyer, the name of a town in the Rhineland. It is one of a number of Jewish surnames that originated this way, along with the better-known Shapiro.

Surname
People with the surname Spiro include:

Alyson Spiro, British actress
Betty Miller (née Spiro) (1910–1965), Irish author
Bjørn Spiro (1909–1999), Danish film actor
Ellen Spiro (b. 1964), American documentary filmmaker
Eugene Spiro (1874–1972), German and American painter
György Spiró (b. 1946), Hungarian dramatist, novelist and essayist
Harold Spiro (1925–1996), English songwriter
Herbert Spiro (1924–2010), German-born American political scientist
Jordana Spiro (b. 1977), American actress
Lev L. Spiro, American film and television director
Karl Spiro (1867–1932), German biologist and physical chemist
Mark Spiro, American songwriter, musician, and record producer
Melford Spiro (1920–2014), American cultural anthropologist
Michel Spiro, French physicist
Peter Spiro, American legal scholar
Samantha Spiro (b. 1968), British actor
Samuel Spiro (d. 1814), Greek-born Argentine naval captain
ARA Spiro (P-43), the corvette of the Argentine Navy named after Samuel Spiro
Stephen Spiro (1939–2007), American political activist

Given name

Spiro
People with the given name Spiro include:

Spiro Agnew (1918–1996), thirty-ninth vice president of the United States
Spyro the Dragon
Spiro Moisiu (1900-1981), Albanian general
Spyros Gogolos, Greek footballer
Spyros Kastanas, Cypriot footballer
Spyros Kyprianou (1932–2002), former President of Cyprus
Spiros Latsis, Greek businessman
Spiros Livathinos (b. 1955), Greek football player, coach, and current head scout
Spyridon Louis (1873–1940), Greek gold medallist of the first modern Olympic Marathon
Spiros Louis Stadium, the Athens Olympic Stadium named after Louis

Spiros/Spyros
Spiros Marangos, Greek footballer
Spiros Markezinis (1909–2000), Greek politician
Spyros Moustakas, Greek writer
Spyros Paliouras, Greek writer
Spyros B. Pavlides, Greek geologist
Spyros Samaras (1861–1917), Greek composer of the Olympic Anthem
Paul Spyros Sarbanes (b. 1933), former US Senator representing Maryland
Spyros Skouras (1893–1971), Greek-American chairman of Twentieth Century Fox from 1942 to 1962
Spyros Spyromilios, Greek Gendarmerie officer
Spyros Vallas (b. 1981), Greek football player
Spiros Velentzas, American Greek Mob Boss
Spiros Vondas, fictional character on the HBO drama The Wire
Spyros Vrettos, Greek poet
Spiros Zodhiates, Greek-American author

Middle name

Spiro
George Spiro Dibie (1932-2022), American cinematographer

See also 
 Spirou
 Spira, a Jewish name sometimes also spelled "Spiro"
 Schapiro, Shapiro
 Schapira, Shapira
 Spire

References

Greek masculine given names
Jewish surnames